The men's 71 kg competition in judo at the 1988 Summer Olympics in Seoul was held on 27 September at the Jangchung Gymnasium. The gold medal was won by Marc Alexandre of France.

Results

Pool A

Pool B

Repechages

Brown won the Pool A repechage, but was later stripped of his medal after testing positive for furosemide.

Final

Final classification

References

Judo at the 1988 Summer Olympics
Judo at the Summer Olympics Men's Lightweight
Men's events at the 1988 Summer Olympics